Teruyoshi (written: 輝良, 輝悦, 輝吉, 晃嘉, 昭慶 or 光良) is a masculine Japanese given name. Notable people with the name include:

, Japanese sport shooter
, Japanese kugyō
, Japanese footballer
, Japanese special effects director
, Japanese sumo wrestler
, Japanese comedian

See also
24919 Teruyoshi, a main-belt minor planet

Japanese masculine given names